Tanu Weds Manu is a 2011 Indian Hindi-language romantic comedy drama by Aanand L. Rai, and produced by Shailesh R Singh. It stars R. Madhavan, Kangana Ranaut, Jimmy Sheirgill, Eijaz Khan, Swara Bhaskar and Deepak Dobriyal. The story of the film has been written by Himanshu Sharma, music is directed by Krsna Solo and the lyrics penned by Rajshekhar. 

Tanu Weds Manu was released on 25 February 2011 and proved to be a commercial success, particularly in Delhi, UP and Punjab. It was dubbed in German and released under the title Tanu Und Manu Trauen Sich. Upon release, it received mixed-to-positive reviews from critics, with praise directed towards its refreshing concept, screenplay, soundtrack and performances of the cast, particularly that of Ranaut.

At the 57th Filmfare Awards, Tanu Weds Manu won the R. D. Burman Award for New Music Talent (Krsna Solo), in addition to a Best Supporting Actress nomination for Bhaskar's performance.

It was remade in Telugu as Mr. Pellikoduku (2013). A sequel, titled Tanu Weds Manu: Returns was released on 22 May 2015.

Plot
Manoj Kumar Sharma alias Manu (Madhavan) is an NRI doctor living in London. He comes to India to find an Indian bride and get married. His parents have already short-listed some girls for him to meet, and they, along with his friend Pappi (Deepak Dobriyal) take him to Kanpur to meet Tanuja Trivedi alias Tanu (Kangana Ranaut). After they land in Kanpur, a bunch of goons grab Manu from the rail station and give him a few slaps, but when Pappi finds Manu he tells him to let it go. At Tanu's house, the two sets of parents find that they get on extremely well with each other, and decide that if Manu likes Tanu, they can finalize the matter immediately. There is one minor hitch: Tanu's mother tells her guests that Tanu has been ill since yesterday and is unable to rise from bed. She asks Manu to go up to Tanu's bedroom and meet her there. She shows Manu to Tanu's room and goes away to the kitchen. Tanu is very unresponsive, and Manu initially thinks that she is shy and bashful. He soon realizes that Tanu is in fact fast asleep. He gazes upon her beautiful sleeping figure, and promptly becomes enamored. He comes downstairs and tells both the families that he is willing to marry her.

Before making the engagement public, the families decide to go on a pilgrimage and seek the blessings of God. During the train journey, Tanu finds an opportunity to speak privately with Manu, and tells him that she had intentionally taken sleeping pills to fall asleep, to avoid meeting him. She tells him rudely that she loves someone else, and that she has her lover's name tattooed on her chest; she also tells him that the thugs who had roughed him up when he initially landed in Kanpur had been sent by her boyfriend. She demands that Manu should now reject her. Manu is extremely disappointed because he likes her immensely, but he dutifully does the decent thing. Taking the blame upon himself, and not revealing to anyone the fact that the girl is having a love affair with another man, he tells his father to convey to Tanu's parents that he has decided not to marry her. Tanu's parents are more than a little miffed at this turn of events, but since the forthcoming engagement was known only to them, there is no public loss of face.

Weeks pass, and Manu's parents bring out other proposals from their shortlist for him to meet. He meets several prospective girls from suitable families, but cannot forget Tanu. One of the girls he meets is Ayushi (Neha Kaul), whose hand has become crooked due to some problem. While the two families are sitting together, Ayushi's brother Raja (Jimmy Sheirgill) comes home, bloodied and disheveled. His father expresses frustration that Raja keeps getting in fights. Later on the roof, Raja and Manu have a conversation where Raja advises Manu to marry his sister despite the condition of her hand as it does not stop her from doing her works properly, and it will heal with proper treatment anyway. Manu agrees that Ayushi is very nice but says he is 'helpless' and cannot marry her. Raja understands something is amiss and respects Manu for being honest.

Later at home Manu declares he would rather not get married now, and expresses his wish to leave for London. But Pappi informs him about the wedding of another school friend Jassi (Eijaz Khan) and they travel to Punjab to attend it. Upon arriving, Manu finds out that Tanu is also attending the wedding, and that she is a friend of Payal (Swara Bhaskar), Jassi's bride-to-be. Jassi and Pappi advise Manu to try and win her over. Over the next few days, Manu and Tanu strike up a friendship. Tanu still has the boyfriend but enjoys Manu's attention, and when Manu inquires about her boyfriend she jokes that for her any guy (or even girl) would do as long as it is not her father's choice. Manu is encouraged. But someone else at the wedding is also crushing on Tanu, and seeing her and Manu spending time together he calls Tanu's parents with the intention of worrying them about a scandal. Jassi called and invited Manu's parents and incidentally both sets of parents arrive at the same time. Tanu thinks that Manu has called them up and is trying to reestablish their cancelled wedding connection. She is upset. This causes tension among her, Manu, Jassi and Payal; feeling guilty, Manu decides to leave. But Tanu comes to the rail station to stop him and tells him she is on the verge of eloping, that she and her lover are going to get secretly married in a registry office, and then present her parents with a fait accompli. She asks him to stay till the wedding.

Manu is heartbroken. As Pappi and he leave on a train back to Chandigarh, they meet Raja again, and after explaining to Raja how Manu is in love with someone, Raja states they will all go back to Kanpur and promises Manu he will marry him to any girl he falls in love with. Jassi also calls and tells Manu that he will not marry without him being present. As Manu and Pappi reach Jassi's "baraat", Manu receives a call from Raja, revealing that Raja is Tanu's boyfriend. Despite Pappi chiding him for it, Manu goes to the registrar's office to be a witness to Raja and Tanu's marriage. The man who is supposed to marry them is busy on the phone and when they are not able to find a pen to sign the papers the man says it is late anyway and they should come back tomorrow for their marriage. While going back, Raja tells Manu that he does not want to be married in this stealthy way, but Tanu's family would never accept him as nobody would recommend him to them properly. Hearing this, Manu later talks to Tanu's father, and convinces him to accept Raja. Tanu's father accepts somewhat unwillingly, and wonders out loud why Manu is doing this. He and Tanu's mother would prefer Manu as their son in law and had been delighted when they got the call about Manu and Tanu being together.

Tanu is scolded by Payal. She accuses Tanu for not being entirely happy with not having to elope- there is no novelty in a proper arranged marriage- not being grateful enough to Manu and not being able to see his love for her. Preparations for Tanu's wedding with Raja begin.  The wedding gift from Manu is a large poster, a collage of numerous photographs of Tanu in her various moods and poses, which Manu had snapped on various occasions, including the one of the first time Manu saw her. Tanu is touched. Later, Raja does not have the time to buy Tanu a wedding lehenga as he has to be somewhere else urgently, so he asks Manu to help him out. It is painful for Manu, but he goes with Tanu to shop for her bridal outfit. While coming back, Tanu asks him whether he actually had a pen with him at the registrar's office. Manu confesses that he did, and lied about not having one like an idiot because he didn't want her to marry Raja. He also talks about his lonely life in London, how he fell in love with Tanu at first sight and how however much he tried to stay away from her it didn't work. Meanwhile, one of the goons who beat Manu up on behalf of Raja has noticed them together in the jeep, recognized him and called Raja. Raja appears, and it is unclear how much of the conversation he has heard, but he takes Tanu away.

Raja and Tanu have a fight. Tanu confesses she has feelings for Manu. Raja is angry, and demands Tanu still marries him as, a few months of fulfilling her wifely duties will make her forget everything.

Raja drops Tanu home. She is torn and emotional, and pulling Manu aside she demands to clearly know whether he loves her or not. She will only believe it if Manu puts his palm on her cheek and professes his love. Manu does so. Tanu, relieved and elated, decides to marry Manu, not Raja.

Tanu's parents rejoice at this turn of events. Manu's parents are also on board with this alliance. But when everyone goes to Raja's place to cancel Tanu's wedding with him, a furious Raja threaten them with a gun and warns of dire consequences if Tanu is married to anyone other than him. He promises he will come to marry Tanu at due time. Everyone comes back worried but Manu is adamant on his wedding with Tanu taking place. Tanu's father bribes an Inspector of Police as per the instruction of Pappi and Jassi, and gets Raja arrested on false charges. The plan is that Raja will remain in jail for a few days, during which time Tanu will be married and safely sent away. However, everyone is shocked to see that Raja is arriving with a wedding procession as promised, at the wedding venue at the same time as Manu, the bridegroom. Raja brandishes a gun and creates a scene. Manu however refuses to be scared and begins reasoning with Raja. Meanwhile, Tanu appears at the door, dressed as a bride, and tells Raja she would only be scared for Manu and as he is not scared, she is not either. The two of them begin to walk away together. Raja aims the gun and almost pulls the trigger, but thinks better of it in the end. He says no one wants him to marry Tanu, not even his mother has given him her blessings for it. He then reminds Manu of the promise he had made to him, and he decides to honor his promise, and tells Tanu he might be many things, but he is not a betrayer. Thus Raja decides to do the right thing, and congratulates the couple with quiet pain evident on his face. He leaves as the proceedings for Tanu and Manu's wedding starts once more.

Cast
 R. Madhavan as Dr. Manoj Kumar Sharma a.k.a. "Manu"
 Kangana Ranaut as Tanuja Trivedi (later Sharma) a.k.a. "Tanu"
 Jimmy Sheirgill as Raja Awasthi
 Eijaz Khan as Jasspreet "Jassi" Gill
Swara Bhaskar as Payal Jassi Gill (Nee'Sinha)
 Deepak Dobriyal as Pappi Kutti
 K K Raina as Kishan Kumar Sharma
 Dipti Mishra as Anju Sharma
 Rajendra Gupta as Rajendra Trivedi
 Navni Parihar as Radha Trivedi 
 Neha Kaul as Ayushi Awasthi , Raja's sister
 Ravi Kishan as Raja's friend
 Archana Shukla as Bulbul Sas

Production
The film had been originally announced with Konkana Sen Sharma playing the role of Tanu. However, after a period of stall, the film was re-announced with Kangana Ranaut replacing the character.

Reception

Critical response
Tanu Weds Manu opened to mixed-to-positive reviews from critics, with praise directed towards its refreshing concept, screenplay, soundtrack and performances of the cast, particularly that of Ranaut; however it was criticized for its story and pacing.

Critic Taran Adarsh of Bollywood Hungama rated it 3.5/5 and noted that "Tanu Weds Manu is a feel-good, light-hearted entertainer with the right dose of humor, drama and romance, besides a popular musical score and some smart dialogue that act as toppings. If you like simple, uncomplicated films that tug at your heartstrings, then chances are that you might just like this sweet little rom-com."

Komal Nahta, from Koimoi says "On the whole, Tanu Weds Manu is a family entertainer which will hit the bull’s eye. It may be a slow starter but it will pick up phenomenally by positive word of mouth and ultimately go on to become a hit."

Nikhat Kazmi, from Times of India stated "the first thing that strikes you about Tanu Weds Manu is a striking sense of familiarity. It wasn't long before you saw Shahid Kapoor playing a similar sacrificial lover to Kareena Kapoor in Jab We Met. But the deja vu doesn't last long. For despite the predictable – and paper-thin – storyline, the film manages to hook you with its sheer atmospherics. Fun while it lasts, Tanu Weds Manu throws up Bollywood's newest obsession – small town girls and their gunas (values) – once again. A meatier storyline and a less messed-up climax would have worked wonders for the film."

Anupama Chopra from NDTV gave 2.5/5 and noted "Though the director picked up an interesting subject, he has not succeeded in executing his story effectively on screen – there are not enough laughs in the film. But there is something missing to make it a perfect romantic comedy. If you are looking for a great romantic comedy, this is not the one, but watch it for Madhavan and his chemistry with Dobriyal."

Noyon Jyoti Parasara of NowRunning.com too gave 2.5/5 and wrote "TWM turns out to be an average film because of the weak second-half. It has a feel-good factor to it, which should work with some part of the audience."

Critic Sukanya Verma from Rediff gave it a 3/5 rating explaining "Tanu Weds Manu is a pleasant experience for most part. Sharma fails to maintain the zing till the very end though. A disappointing, lengthy and gabby third-act makes Tanu Weds Manu's running time of 2 hours and 15 minutes longer than it is. It doesn't take offence at anything but will charm you anyway.

Monica Chopra from Sify rated 3/5 and mentioned "What's not to like? There's the shaadi-baaraat, the romance, lovely clothes, and the atmospherics that transport you into another world.Yes, the film is cliché-ridden, has elements of rom-coms like Jab We Met, and Shergill's character-track doesn't quite add up, but the film isn't aiming for anything more than a one-time watch entertainer. Anand L Rai          (Thodi Life Thoda Magic, Strangers) makes a sweet romantic comedy that'll have you smiling as you leave the theatre."

Rajeev Masand of CNN IBN gave it a 2 star-rating explaining "Tanu Weds Manu isn't all bad. There are portions in the first-half that are enjoyable. But held together by a fractured script, they fail to take good shape."

Box-Office
Tanu Weds Manu collected Rs. 185 million in its first week of release. The film held up well in its second week with collections of around Rs. 85.0 million. Its 2-week total was Rs. 272.5 million nett. Its business was steady in the third week with around Rs. 50 million nett which took the collections to Rs. 322.5 million nett in 3 weeks. In the fourth week, the film collected Rs. 35.0 million nett taking its 4-week collections to Rs. 360 million nett.

Soundtrack

The soundtracks are composed by Krsna Solo with lyrics written by Rajshekhar.

Accolades

Remake
Tanu Weds Manu was remade in Telugu as Mr. Pellikoduku with actress Isha Chawla along with South Indian actor Sunil.

Sequel
Following the positive response from Tanu Weds Manu, the team considered making a sequel to carry a story forward showing the next chapter of the couple's life. The sequel titled Tanu Weds Manu Returns was released on 22 May 2015. The film received positive reviews from critics, with particular praise directed towards Ranaut's performance..

References

External links
 
 

2011 films
Films scored by Krsna Solo
Films set in Uttar Pradesh
Films shot in Lucknow
Indian romantic comedy-drama films
2010s Hindi-language films
Films set in Delhi
Films shot in Delhi
2011 romantic comedy-drama films
Films about Indian weddings
Hindi films remade in other languages
Viacom18 Studios films
Films set in Kanpur
Films shot in Kanpur
Films directed by Aanand L. Rai
2011 comedy films
2011 drama films